Earl Poole Ball Jr. (born March 12, 1941) is an American singer-songwriter,  pianist, music producer and actor. His musical work spans the Ameripolitan, Country, Americana and Rockabilly genres. He has performed with many well known American musicians, including Buck Owens & The Buckaroos, Gram Parsons, Carl Perkins, Merle Haggard, Freddie Hart, Marty Stuart, Phil Ochs, Michael Nesmith, Marty Robbins, Wynn Stewart, The Flying Burrito Brothers and The Byrds.  He is best known for his 20 years spent touring and recording with Johnny Cash.  (1977-1997)

Early years 

Ball was born in Foxworth, Mississippi.  An only child, he was raised by his parents and grandparents.  His father ran a pool hall. "Earl Poole Ball" sounds like a stage name, but it is his given name; "Poole" is his grandmother's maiden name.

When Ball Jr was eight years old, he began taking piano lessons from his aunt Kathryn Ball, the minister of music at The Foxworth First Baptist Church.  He learned classical music and hymns, and later chords and music theory, and played the popular music from radio programs.  Ball and some friends formed a band called The Hill Cats, and played at local venues. Ball also worked as a bus boy in a diner.

Career

Early career 

At the age of 16, Earl was hired to play piano on The Jimmy Swan Television Show in Hattiesburg.
After graduating from High School, Ball moved to Hattiesburg and continued playing music on the show and in local night clubs.  He supplemented his income by selling Fuller Brushes door-to-door.  Ball was introduced to blues by Dr. John.

In 1959 Ball was hired to play piano as part of the re-election campaign for Louisiana Governor Jimmie Davis.

Ball enrolled in college in Hattiesburg for three months but spent most of his time playing in honky-tonks.  His young marriage broke up, and Ball moved to Houston,  where he spent the next three years playing in honky-tonks at night and selling sewing machines by day.  His old band from Hattiesburg relocated to Houston and Earl had a regular gig with them at The Silver Dollar Lounge.  He learned some practical skills from country piano player and singer Mickey Gilley.

After three years in Houston, Earl headed to Los Angeles.  He was hired as a piano player in a Country Music TV series which eventually became a movie called “Country A-G0-G0”. There he met drummer Jon Corneal, who Earl would later work with on the Gram Parsons recording sessions.

Back in L.A., Ball performed as part of the house band at The Aces Club and played every Sunday afternoon on the TV show Cal's Corral.  He then was hired for the house band at The Palomino Club.  He was so busy that he turned down an offer from Elvis Presley's guitarist James Burton to join Elvis' stage band.  Ball also played on a number of sessions with Buck Owens' Buckaroos.

Ball wrote and did session work for Stone's Central Songs.  His songs were recorded, and reached the top of Billboard's chart, by Glen Campbell (“Try A Little Kindness”) and Waylon Jennings (“The Only Daddy That'll Walk The Line”). Earl then began working at Capitol Records, starting as a sessions player and associate producer under Ken Nelson, who was vice-president of Capitol's Country Music Division.  Ball worked with many artists on Nelson's roster including Buck Owens, Merle Haggard, Wynn Stewart, Stoney Edwards, Susan Raye, Wanda Jackson, Bonnie Owens, Freddie Hart and folk/protest singer Phil Ochs.

Earl played on the original recording of 'Don't Bogart Me'.  By The Fraternity of Man, which was in the 1969 film “Easy Rider”.  Ball recorded with Gram Parsons and The International Submarine Band on the album “Safe at Home”, and again when Parsons was with The Byrds, on the album “Sweetheart of the Rodeo”.

Nashville 

In 1971 Ball was transferred to Nashville, where he continued to produce and do session work for Capitol Records.  He produced Freddie Hart's album “My Hang-Up Is You”, which included two #1 singles on the Country Music Chart.  Ball also performed in the Nashville club scene and in studio sessions for Atlantic records.  His friend Harlan Howard introduced him to Johnny Cash.  He recorded with Cash in 1973 on a record that Don Davis was producing, and again in 1977, at which time he was hired to tour with Cash.  He produced Cash's 1980 album “Rockabilly Blues”. Ball stayed with the band for 20 years, touring and performing on Cash's TV specials until Cash's retirement in 1997.

Ball played piano on two songs on the 1985 album Lost & Found by Nashville-based cowpunk band Jason & the Scorchers: "Broken Whiskey Glass" and "Far Behind". In 1999, he recalled that while he was working on the latter tune, James Burton dropped by the studio to show Scorchers guitarist Warner E. Hodges some licks.

Film career 

Director Peter Bogdanovich included the song I Don't Think I Could Take You Back Again, which was written by Earl Poole Ball and Jo-El Sonnier, in his 1981 film They All Laughed.  Ball was hired to play piano in the film, and began to take acting lessons.  He also appeared in a 1981 TV movie with Cash and Brenda Vaccaro called The Pride of Jesse Hallam.  In 1983, he and Cash worked together on another made-for-TV film Murder in Coweta County with actor Andy Griffith.

In 1986 Earl moved back to California and found more work in character roles on movies such as Texasville (1990) and The Thing Called Love (1993).

Austin, Texas 
In 1999 Ball moved to Austin, Texas.  He continues to write songs, perform and do session work.  He performs live with several bands including Heybale!, Earl Poole Ball's Rockabilly Blues Band and Earl Poole Ball and The Cosmic Americans.

Discography

As performer

As writer/arranger 

I'd give a Whole Lot of Me for a Little Bit of You – Various:blue Ribbon Country Vol 1 – Capitol, 1969
Phil Ochs – Greatest Hits – A&M Records, 1970
Wynn Stewart – Heavenly/You're No Secret of Mine – Capitol, 1970
Terry Stafford – Say, Has Anybody Seen My Sweet Gypsy Rose – Atlantic, 1974
Linda Ronstadt – Hand Sown...Home Grown – Capitol Records, 2004
Ray Stanley – Yolanda/ I've Wasted My Love – Chaparral
Vern Stovall and The Showmen – The Wreck of the Olds 88/ Break Time – Longhorn Records
Bobby George – I Wish I Was Coming Home(To You)/ Heart of The City – Pompeii Records

As producer 

Wynn Stewart – It's a Beautiful Day – Capitol, 1970
Bobby Austin – When Your Sweet Love Carried On – Capitol, 1970
Wynn Stewart – Heavenly/ You're No Secret of Mine – Capitol, 1970
Beth Moore – Put Your Hand in The Hand – Capitol, 1971
Wynn Stewart – Baby, It's Yours/ I Was the First One to Know – Capitol, 1971
Stoney Edwards – Mama's Love/ Poor Folks Stick Together – Capitol, 1971
Wynn Stewart – Baby, It's Yours – Capitol, 1971
Freddie Hart – My Hang-Up is You/ Big Bad Wolf – Capitol, 1972
Marty Mitchell - Midnight Man - Atlantic, 1974
Terry Stafford - Stop If You Love Me – Atlantic, 1974
Terry Stafford – Say, Has Anybody Seen My Sweet Gypsy Rose – Atlantic, 1974
Terry Stafford – Captured – Atlantic, 1974
Johnny Cash – Rockabilly Blues – Columbia, 1980
Johhny Cash – Song of the Patriot – Columbia, 1980
Johnny Cash – The Essential Johnny Cash 1955-1983 (producer of 2 cuts) – Columbia, Legacy, 1992
Merle Haggard – The Studio Recordings, 1969-1976 - Bear Family (Germany), 2007

Film 

 The Thing Called Love (1993)
 They All Laughed (1981)
 Texasville(1990)

Television 

 Jimmy Swan Television Show (1956 - 1957)
 Country A Go-Go (1964)
 Cal's Corral (1964-1965)
 The Pride of Jesse Hallam (1981)
 Murder in Coweta County (1983)
 The Baron and the Kid (1984)
 Naked City: A Killer Christmas (1998)

External links 

 Earl's piano solo "Last Date" with Johnny Cash Prague 1978 – YouTube of live performance.
 KUT Radio Show with Heybale! 2009. 
 Official website:

References 

"Earl Poole Ball", radio interview at KUT, Austin Texas, 3/1/12.

1941 births
Living people
American country singer-songwriters
American male singer-songwriters
People from Marion County, Mississippi
Country musicians from Mississippi
Singer-songwriters from Mississippi
American male film actors
American male television actors
20th-century American male actors
20th-century American singers
Male actors from Mississippi
20th-century American male singers
21st-century American male singers
21st-century American singers